Siegfried Schnell (23 January 1916 – 25 February 1944) was a German military aviator who served in the Luftwaffe during World War II. As a fighter ace, he was credited with 93—that is, 93 aerial combat encounters resulting in the destruction of the enemy aircraft—claimed in an unknown number of combat missions. He had three victories on the Eastern Front and 90 over the Western Allies, including 12 four-engine bombers.

Born in Zielenzig, Schnell joined the Luftwaffe in 1936. At the start of World war II, he served with Jagdgeschwader 2 "Richthofen". He claimed his first aerial victory on 14 May 1940 during the Battle of France. On 7 November, he claimed his 20th aerial victory for which he was awarded the Knight's Cross of the Iron Cross. On 1 July 1941, he was made a Staffelkapitän (squadron leader). He claimed his 45th aerial victory on 9 July for which he was awarded the Knight's Cross of the Iron Cross with Oak Leaves, it was Germany's highest military decoration at the time of its presentation to Schnell.

On 1 May 1943, Schnell was appointed Gruppenkommandeur (group commander) of III. Gruppe of Jagdgeschwader 54 (JG 54—54th Fighter Wing) which was fighting in Defense of the Reich. On 1 February 1944, he was given command of IV. Gruppe of JG 54, based near Leningrad on the Eastern Front. Schnell was killed in action on 25 February 1944 during the Soviet Narva offensive when he was shot down by an opposing fighter near Narva, Estonia.

Early life and career
Schnell was born on 23 January 1916 in Zielenzig, at the time in the Province of Brandenburg of the German Empire. A keen glider-pilot, he joined the Luftwaffe in 1936, and by the start of the war in 1939, he was a Feldwebel serving with 4. Staffel (4th squadron) of Jagdgeschwader 2 "Richthofen", named after the World War I fighter ace Manfred von Richthofen, under the command of Oberleutnant Hans "Assi" Hahn. The Staffel was subordinated to II. Gruppe (2nd group) which had been created on 15 December 1939 at Zerbst and placed under the command of Hauptmann Wolfgang Schellmann. The unit was formed from elements of both I. Gruppe of JG 2 and I. Gruppe of Jagdgeschwader 3 (JG 3—3rd Fighter Wing). The Gruppe was officially declared operational on 15 January 1940.

World War II
At the start of the Battle of France, II. Gruppe of JG 2 was deployed on the northern sector of Army Group B and had been ordered to an airfield at Hamminkeln on 11 May. Initially subordinated to the IV. Fliegerkorps (4th Air Corps), the Gruppe flew fighter escort missions on the first three days of the campaign for Lehrgeschwader 1 (LG 1—1st Demonstration Wing), Kampfgeschwader 27 (KG 27—27th Bomber Wing) and Sturzkampfgeschwader 3 (StG 3—3rd Dive Bomber Wing) attacking targets in the Netherlands. On 14 May, II. Gruppe was ordered to Peer in Belgium where the Gruppe was placed under the command of the Stab of Jagdgeschwader 26 "Schlageter" (JG 26—26th Fighter Wing). That day, Schnell claimed his first aerial victory, a French Bloch 152 fighter.

Following the Armistice of 22 June 1940, combat operation concluded on 25 June. On 27 June, II. Gruppe was ordered to Beaumont-le-Roger, patrolling the English Channel and participated in the occupation of Guernsey on 1 July. Schnell claimed his first aerial victory during the Battle of Britain on 29 July when he shot down a Bristol Blenheim bomber northwest of Le Havre. On 7 November, off the Isle of Wight, as operations were slowing down and recently commissioned as a Leutnant (on 1 November), he claimed his 20th aerial victory. For this feat he was awarded the Knight's Cross of the Iron Cross on 9 November.

Squadron leader
The focus of the airwar shifted in the next year to the Eastern Front, however Schnell stayed with JG 2 defending the West. On 1 July 1941, he was appointed as Staffelkapitän (squadron leader) of 9. Staffel of JG 2. He succeeded Oberleutnant Carl-Hans Röders who was killed in action on 23 June. On 3 July, III. Gruppe moved to St. Pol-Brias where it would be based for more than four months. That day, Schnell claimed a Supermarine Spitfire fighter shot down east of Gravelines, his first aerial victory as Staffelkapitän. The following day, he was credited with four further Spitfires shot down.

Soon after, he shot down nine Spitfires in just two days (8 – 9 July) to reach his 45th victory and was awarded the Knight's Cross of the Iron Cross with Oak Leaves, at the time being one of the top pilots in JG 2. He continued to score consistently as the Royal Air Force (RAF) mounted heavier strikes into France, and temporarily held command of III. Gruppe from 9 December 1941 to the following 28 January while Gruppenkommandeur (group commander) Hans "Assi" Hahn was on leave. Schnell claimed a Handley Page Hampden bomber during Operation Donnerkeil. The Channel Dash operation (11–13 February 1942) by the Kriegsmarine was codenamed Operation Cerberus by the Germans. In support of this, the Luftwaffe, formulated an air superiority plan dubbed Operation Donnerkeil for the protection of the three German capital ships. Over the Dieppe Raid on 19 August 1942, he shot down five Spitfires to reach his 70th victory, making him an "ace-in-a-day" for the second time. Schnell was promoted to Hauptmann of the Reserves on 1 February 1943.

Group commander
After that his scoring rate slowed down as he focussed more on administration and command, and he led his unit in the changeover onto the new Focke Wulf Fw 190—a very rugged dogfighter. In a misguided idea by High Command to rotate the fighter Gruppen between Western and Eastern Fronts, III. Gruppe of Jagdgeschwader 54 (JG 54—54th Fighter Wing) was transferred from the Eastern Front back to Germany for Defence of the Reich. Hauptmann Schnell, was given command of the unit on 1 May 1943 to train and lead the pilots in high-altitude interception rather than the low-level brawling they were used to on the Eastern Front. He had taken command of the Gruppe from Major Reinhard Seiler who was transferred. Command of his former 9. Staffel of JG 2 had already been passed on to Oberleutnant Josef Wurmheller on 1 April. On 11 January 1944, III. Gruppe defended against a raid flown by the United States Army Air Forces resulting in eleven Boeing B-17 Flying Fortress bombers shot down, including three by Schnell.

On 1 February 1944, he was given command of IV. Gruppe of JG 54, based near Leningrad, and he arrived on 11 February. He replaced Hauptmann Rudolf Sinner. As mentioned above, command transfers between fronts were rare, given the markedly different combat conditions, and unfortunately Schnell was not lucky to be able to adapt quickly enough. After less than a month and three further aerial victories, he was shot down and killed in his Messerschmitt Bf 109 G-6 (Werknummer 411675—factory number) over the Russian offensive for Narva on 25 February 1944. Posthumously, he was promoted to Major of the Reserves. He was succeeded by Hauptmann Gerhard Koall as commander of IV. Gruppe of JG 54.

Summary of career

Aerial victory claims
According to Spick and Zabecki, Schnell was credited with 93 aerial victories claimed in an unknown number combat missions. This figure includes 23 aerial victories during the Battle of France and Britain, further 64 aerial victories over the Western Front and six more on the Eastern Front. Mathews and Foreman, authors of Luftwaffe Aces — Biographies and Victory Claims, researched the German Federal Archives and found documentation for 83 aerial victory claims, plus two further unconfirmed claims. All of his aerial victories were claimed over the Western Allies and includes ten four-engined bombers.

Victory claims were logged to a map-reference (PQ = Planquadrat), for example "PQ 05 Ost 1176". These sectors were then subdivided into 36 smaller units to give a location area 3 × 4 km in size.

Awards
 Iron Cross (1939)
 2nd Class (10 June 1940)
 1st Class (14 September 1940)
 German Cross in Gold on 16 July 1942 as Oberleutnant in the 9./Jagdgeschwader 52
 Knight's Cross of the Iron Cross with Oak Leaves
 Knight's Cross  on 9 November 1940 as Leutnant and pilot in the II./Jagdgeschwader 2 "Richthofen"
 18th Oak Leaves on 9 July 1941 as Leutnant and pilot in the 9./Jagdgeschwader 2 "Richthofen"

Notes

References

Citations

Bibliography

 
 
 
 
 
 
 
 
 
 
 
 
 
 
 
 
 
 Sundin, Claes & Bergström. Christer (1997). Luftwaffe Fighter Aircraft in Profile.  Altglen, PA: Schiffer Military History.   including colour profiles of aircraft (#27 & #32)
 
 Weal, John (1996). 	Bf109D/E Aces 1939-41.  Oxford: Osprey Publishing Limited.	.
 
 
 
 
 
 
 

1916 births
1944 deaths
People from Sulęcin
Luftwaffe pilots
German World War II flying aces
Luftwaffe personnel killed in World War II
People from the Province of Brandenburg
Recipients of the Gold German Cross
Recipients of the Knight's Cross of the Iron Cross with Oak Leaves
Aviators killed by being shot down